Cheick Oumar Bathily (born 10 October 1982) is a retired Malian football goalkeeper.

Career 
In 2009 left Djoliba AC and signed for League rival CS Duguwolofila.

International 
He was part of the Malian 2004 Olympic football team, who exited in the quarter finals, finishing top of group A, but losing to Italy in the next round.

Notes

1982 births
Living people
Malian footballers
Mali international footballers
Olympic footballers of Mali
Footballers at the 2004 Summer Olympics
Djoliba AC players
CS Duguwolofila players
2004 African Cup of Nations players
Association football goalkeepers
21st-century Malian people
Mali A' international footballers